Louis-Pierre Baltard (9 July 1764 – 22 January 1846) was a French architect, and engraver and father of Victor Baltard.

Life

He was born in Paris. He was originally a landscape painter, but in his travels through Italy was struck with the beauty of the Italian buildings, and changed his profession, devoting himself to architecture.

In his new occupation he achieved great success, and was selected to prepare the plans for some of the largest public edifices in Paris. His reputation is chiefly based on his skill in engraving. Among the best known of his plates are the drawings of Paris (Paris et ses monuments, 1803), the engravings for Denon's Égypte, the illustrations of Napoleon's wars (La Colonne de la grande armée), and those contained in the series entitled the Grand prix de l'architecture, which for some time he carried on alone. He also gained distinction as an engraver of portraits.

Baltard died, aged 81, in Lyon.

Family
Two of his children were also architects. Of these the more important was Victor Baltard, who designed Les Halles, Saint-Augustin, Paris, and the facade of Notre-Dame-des-Blancs-Manteaux.

Architectural works 
Louis-Pierre Baltard and Jean-Baptiste Rondelet were candidates in the competition to  transform the Panthéon de Paris into the « temple de la Gloire ». In 1813, on the death of  Alexandre Théodore Brongniart, Baltard proposed to undertake the building of the Palais Brongniart, but was unsuccessful.
 The Palais de Justice in Lyon
 Chapel of the prison Sainte-Pélagie, Paris.
 Hospital and chapel  of the prison Saint-Lazare, Paris (1834)
 Prison Saint-Joseph, Perrache  Lyon (1836)
 Palais de Justice (nicknamed « Les 24 colonnes »), Lyon, on the quays of the river Saône (1842)

See also

 List of works by Eugène Guillaume

References

Attribution

1764 births
1846 deaths
Painters from Paris
Academic staff of École Polytechnique
18th-century French engravers
19th-century French engravers
19th-century French male artists
18th-century French painters
19th-century French painters
19th-century French architects
Chevaliers of the Légion d'honneur
Academic staff of the École des Beaux-Arts
18th-century French male artists